The Balabac Strait is one of the straits that connects the South China Sea with the Sulu Sea. It separates Balabac Island (Palawan province), Philippines, from Balambangan and the Banggi Islands north of Borneo that are a part of Malaysia's Sabah state.

It was therefore likely to have been below sea level before the last ice age, which could have permitted an exchange of flora and fauna between Borneo and the Palawans, such as the tiger.

See also 
 Malaysia–Philippines border – the border between the two countries.
 Mindoro Strait – another strait connecting the South China Sea with the Sulu Sea.

References 

Straits of the Philippines
Straits of Malaysia
Straits of the South China Sea
Bodies of water of the Sulu Sea
Malaysia–Philippines border
Landforms of Palawan
Landforms of Sabah
International straits